Harrington's rat (Desmomys harringtoni)  is a species of rodent in the family Muridae.
It is found only in Ethiopia.
Its natural habitats are subtropical or tropical moist montane forests and subtropical or tropical moist shrubland.

References
 Lavrenchenko, L. 2004.  Desmomys harringtoni.   2006 IUCN Red List of Threatened Species.   Downloaded on 19 July 2007.

Endemic fauna of Ethiopia
Desmomys
Mammals of Ethiopia
Mammals described in 1902
Taxa named by Oldfield Thomas
Taxonomy articles created by Polbot